"De Politie" is the second single released from Flemish/Dutch girl group K3' tenth studio album MaMaSé!. It was written by Miquel Wiels,  A. Putte, and P. Gillis. The producer was Studio 100. The song premiered in October 2009 on the reality television show K2 Zoekt K3, which was the search for a new third K3 member (Kathleen Aerts had left back in March). It wasn't released as a single but only as a download. The song was released in Belgium in December 2009. It was released in the Netherlands in February 2010.

Music video
In the music video the girls dance in their police outfits and catch a bad guy. The video was filmed a week after Josje won K2 zoekt K3.

References
  Ultratop
  Hit of shit: K3, de politie
  K3: De Politie

2009 singles
2009 songs